Solkin Ruz (born as Solkin Ruz Ondátegui on 30 March 1991) is a Mexican television actor best known for his role of Javi in the Televisa telenovela La vecina. His other notable TV roles include Yago, Por siempre Joan Sebastian as Pancho, Enamorándome de Ramón as Chava and Un poquito tuyo as Wisin Garcia. He also debuted in the Mexican film directed by Germán Quintero titled Como te ves me vi in 2017.

Biography 
Solkin Ruz Ondátegui was born on 30 March 1991 in Mexico City, Mexico. Before making his acting debut, he graduated from the Centro de Educación Artística de Televisa in 2012.

Career

2010s
Since 2012, Solkin has participated in additional episodes in television series such as La rosa de Guadalupe and Como dice el dicho. In 2015, he participated in the telenovela La vecina produced by Lucero Suarez, along with Esmeralda Pimentel and Juan Diego Covarrubias. In 2016, he has participated in series such as Yago and Por siempre Joan Sebastian. In 2017, Solkin debuted in the Mexican film Como te ves me vi, who shared credits with Cristina Rodlo, Rocío Verdejo and Juan Ríos also he participates in the soap opera Enamorándome de Ramón, again produced with Lucero Suarez, along with Esmeralda Pimentel and José Ron.

In 2019, he participated in the soap opera Un poquito tuyo, alongside Jorge Salinas, Lorena Herrera and Marjorie de Sousa.

Filmography

Film

Television

References

External links 
 
 Solkin Ruz on Youtube

21st-century Mexican male actors
1991 births
Living people
Mexican YouTubers
Spanish-language YouTubers
YouTube channels launched in 2011
Male actors from Mexico City
Mexican male stage actors
Video bloggers
Male bloggers